Georgios Alogoskoufis (born 17 October 1955) is a professor of economics at the Athens University of Economics and Business since 1990. He was a member of the Hellenic Parliament from September 1996 till October 2009 and served as Greece's Minister of Economy and Finance from March 2004 till January 2009.

Background, academic and political career

George Alogoskoufis was born in Athens on 17 October 1955.

The economic policy mix applied under the leadership of Alogoskoufis

In the period in which Alogoskoufis served as the minister for Economy and Finance, he actuated a series of economic structural reforms and fiscal adjustment to contain budget deficits, which, although unpopular, have managed to slash Greece's high 2004 budget deficit. In the same period of time, Greece's gross domestic product has grown by one of the highest growth rates in the Eurozone. Unemployment also fell significantly.

During 2004–2007, marginal corporate and personal income taxes were reduced. He worked extensively with the private sector  and sold over euro 6 billion of government holdings. However, these reforms did not prove sufficient to avert Greece external debt crisis in 2010.

Criticism 
George Alogoskoufis was pelted with eggs by Greek left wing activists at a meeting held at the London School of Economics on 14 November 2008. The activists threw the eggs as a protest against the Greek government.

Publications

Alogoskoufis is the author of seven books and has published widely in macroeconomics, international monetary economics and public economics.

Over 40 papers have been published in some of the most prestigious international academic journals including the American Economic Review, the Journal of Political Economy, the Journal of Monetary Economics, the European Economic Review, Economica, the Journal of the Japanese and International Economies, Economic Journal and the Economic Policy. His research focuses on unemployment, inflation, exchange rates, economic growth and monetary and fiscal policy.

He has given invited lectures in some of the most prestigious universities in Europe, the US and Japan and has presented papers in a number of academic conferences worldwide.

Books

“External Constraints on Macroeconomic Policy: The European Experience” (with Lucas Papademos and Richard Portes), Centre for Economic Policy Research, 1991.

“The crisis of economic policy”, Kritiki, Athens, 1994 (in Greek).

“Unemployment: Choices for Europe, Monitoring European Integration 5” (with Charles Bean, Giuseppe Bertola, Daniel Cohen, Juan Dolado, Gilles Saint-Paul), Centre for Economic Policy Research, 1995.

“The Drachma: From the Phoenix to the Euro” (with Sophia Lazaretou), Livanis, Athens, 2002 (in Greek).

“Greece after the crisis”, Kastaniotis, Athens, 2009 (in Greek).

"International Economics and the World Economy", Gutenberg, Athens 2013 (in Greek)

"Dynamic Macroeconomics", MIT Press, Cambridge Mass. 2019

Publications in academic journals
The following is a selected list of journal articles by Alogoskoufis.

  Pdf.
  Pdf.
  Pdf.
  Pdf.
  Pdf.
  Pdf.
  Pdf.
  Pdf.
  Pdf.
  Pdf.
  Pdf.
  Pdf.
  Pdf.
  Pdf.
  Pdf.
 
  Pdf.
  Pdf.
  Pdf.
 
  Pdf.
  Pdf.
  Pdf.

Awards and honorary distinctions

His PhD thesis was awarded the R. S. Sayers Prize of the London University for 1981. His book, "The Drachma: From the Phoenix to the Euro", was awarded the prize of the Academy of Athens in 2002.

References

External links
Official website of the Greek Ministry of Economy and Finance
Personal Website of George Alogoskoufis

Podcasts of George Alogoskoufis in itunes

1955 births
Academics of Birkbeck, University of London
Alumni of the London School of Economics
Academic staff of the Athens University of Economics and Business
Finance ministers of Greece
Greek government-debt crisis
Greek MPs 1996–2000
Greek MPs 2000–2004
Greek MPs 2004–2007
Greek MPs 2007–2009
National and Kapodistrian University of Athens alumni
New Democracy (Greece) politicians
Living people
Fellows of the European Economic Association
Politicians from Athens